Hamza Idris (born 27 July 1972) is a journalist and editor of Nigeria's Daily Trust Newspapers, one of the leading newspapers in Nigeria. He oversees the three titles on its stable:  Daily Trust, Daily Trust Saturday and Daily Trust on Sunday.

He is a Fellow of the International Centre for Journalists (ICFJ) who participated in the maiden edition of the United States’ Exchange Programme for Media Professionals from Africa in 2013. He is an author, an alumnus of the Professional Fellows Programme and participant of the Peace Mediation Course (Switzerland, 2015).

Early life and education 
Hamza was born in Jos, Plateau State, on 27 July 1972, although his parents were originally from Mai'adua Local LGovernment of Katsina State.

He was at St. Theresa's Boys School in Jos, Plateau State between 1978 and 1984 for his primary education. He attended Teachers’ College Toro, Bauchi State between 1984 and 1990, where he obtained the Grade II Teachers Certificate. He obtained a Diploma in Accounting from the University of Jos in 1995. He holds a Bachelor of Arts (BA) Degree in Mass Communication from the University of Maiduguri in 2002 and a Master of Science Degree (MSc) in Mass Communications from the National Open University of Nigeria in 2019.

Career 
Hamza joined the Media Trust Limited, publishers of Daily Trust titles in 2005, and reported from Adamawa, Yobe and Borno states, respectively. He was a reporter, correspondent, Acting Bureau Chief and Bureau Chief; Group Politics Editor and is now the Editor handling the three titles of the newspaper.

While reporting from the North East, Hamza also served as the Editor of Kanem Trust, an 8-page community news pull-out that covered the North Eastern states of Nigeria.

In 2015, he was redeployed to the newspaper's headquarters in Abuja Nigeria as Group Politics Editor. He was appointed Editor of the paper on September 4, 2019. On November 9, 2020, he was appointed as pioneer Editor of the three titles: Daily Trust, Daily Trust Saturday and Daily Trust on Sunday.

He is a Member of the Daily Trust's Editorial Board (July 2015 - date). He also sat on the Editorial Board of Pittsburgh Post-Gazette, USA, as an intern in 2013.

Hamza has written over 6,000 news stories and features on security especially the Boko haram insurgency, political, social and economic issues in Nigeria, Africa and the world that were published in the Daily Trust titles. Some of the write-ups have been culled by international journals and serve as reference for undergraduate and postgraduate students.

He was one of the targets of Nigerian military crackdown on journalists when armed soldiers stormed the Daily Trust newspaper's headquarters in Abuja.

Publications 
Hamza has co-authored a chapter in the following published works:

 Multiculturalism, Diversity and Reporting Conflict in Nigeria, Evans Brothers (Nigeria Publishers) Limited, edited by Professor Umaru A. Pate and Professor Lai Oso (2017).
 Assault on Journalism, edited by Ulla Carlsson and Reeta Poythari, Nordicom, University of Gothenburg, Sweden (2017).
Nigeria: Hearts and Minds. A contribution to the ZAM//African Investigative Publishing Collective (AIPC) Transnational Investigation. ZAM Magazine, Chronicle 17, December 2015, Amsterdam, the Netherlands.

Awards 
Hamza won the Editor of the Year award at the 30th edition of the Nigerian Media Merit Award (NMMA) 2022. He defeated other nominees to clinch the award. The ceremony was held at Eko Hotel in lagos, Nigeria.

See also 
 List of Nigerian media personalities

References 

1972 births
Living people
Nigerian journalists
University of Maiduguri alumni
People from Plateau State